Amadou Dante (born 7 October 2000) is a Malian footballer currently playing as a left-back for Austrian club Sturm Graz.

Career statistics

Club

Notes

References

2000 births
Living people
Malian footballers
Malian expatriate footballers
Mali youth international footballers
Association football midfielders
Austrian Football Bundesliga players
SK Sturm Graz players
TSV Hartberg players
Malian expatriate sportspeople in Austria
Expatriate footballers in Austria
21st-century Malian people